This is a list of festivals in Georgia.

By type

General
Athfest — Athens 
Atlanta Dogwood Festival — Atlanta 
Atlanta Ice Cream Festival —  Atlanta 
Big Pig Jig — Vienna
Big Shanty Festival — Kennesaw
The Great Locomotive Chase Festival — Adairsville
Hogansville Hummingbird Festival — Hogansville
Marble Festival — Jasper
Yellow Daisy Festival —  Stone Mountain
St. Patrick's Festival — Dublin

Cultural
Decatur Book Festival / www.decaturbookfestival.com — Decatur 
Georgia Renaissance Festival — near Fairburn
International Cherry Blossom Festival — Macon
Johns Creek International Festival — Johns Creek
Polish Pierogi Festival — Lawrenceville

Film
Atlanta Film Festival  — Atlanta
Atlanta Jewish Film Festival  — Atlanta

Folk

Georgia Apple Festival — Ellijay

Music
ProgPower USA — Atlanta
Savannah Music Festival — Savannah
Snellville Days Festival — Snellville

See also
List of festivals in the United States

References

External links

 
Georgia
Festivals
Georgia